In ethics and other branches of philosophy, death poses difficult questions, answered differently by various philosophers. Among the many topics explored by the philosophy of death are suicide, capital punishment, abortion, personal identity, immortality and definition of death.

See also
 Advocacy of suicide
 letting die
 Right to die

References

Further reading

External links

Philosophy of death
Issues in ethics
Philosophy of life